PB-22 (QUPIC, SGT-21 or 1-pentyl-1H-indole-3-carboxylic acid 8-quinolinyl ester) is a designer drug offered by online vendors as a cannabimimetic agent, and detected being sold in synthetic cannabis products in Japan in 2013. PB-22 represents a structurally unique synthetic cannabinoid chemotype, since it contains an ester linker at the indole 3-position, rather than the precedented ketone of JWH-018 and its analogs, or the amide of APICA and its analogs.

PB-22 has an EC50 of 5.1 nM for human CB1 receptors, and 37 nM for human CB2 receptors. PB-22 produces bradycardia and hypothermia in rats at doses of 0.3–3 mg/kg, suggesting potent cannabinoid-like activity. The magnitude and duration of hypothermia induced in rats by PB-22 was notably greater than JWH-018, AM-2201, UR-144, XLR-11, APICA, or STS-135, with a reduction of body temperature still observable six hours after dosing. One clinical toxicology study found PB-22 to be the cause of seizures in a human and his dog.

History
PB-22 was originally developed by New Zealand legal highs company Stargate International in 2012 as SGT-21, intended to be a structural hybrid of QMPSB and JWH-018. However, no intellectual property protection was applied for and the compound quickly became subject to widespread grey-market sales outside the control of the inventors.

Detection 
A forensic standard of PB-22 is available, and the compound has been posted on the Forendex website of potential drugs of abuse.

Legal status 
As of 9 May 2014, PB-22 is no longer legal in New Zealand.

In January 2014, PB-22 was designated as a Schedule I controlled substance in the United States.

In Ohio, PB-22 is illegal.

Florida also has banned PB-22.

Since 13 December 2014 it is also illegal in Germany because of adding the substance to the BtMG Anlage II.

As of October 2015 PB-22 is a controlled substance in China.

See also 
 5F-PB-22
 QUCHIC
 APICA

References 

Cannabinoids
Designer drugs
Indoles